Jean-Marie Demange (23 July 1943 in Toulouse – 17 November 2008) was a French member of Parliament.  A member of the UMP he was Mayor of Thionville for 13 years, serving in that capacity from 25 June 1995 to 21 March 2008. He had been distraught after losing the 2008 election to a Socialist and committed suicide by gunshot after he killed his mistress following a heated argument.

References

External links
 Le Monde 

1943 births
2008 deaths
Rally for the Republic politicians
Union for a Popular Movement politicians
French politicians who committed suicide
Suicides by firearm in France
Murder–suicides in France
French murderers
Politicians from Toulouse
Deputies of the 12th National Assembly of the French Fifth Republic
Deputies of the 13th National Assembly of the French Fifth Republic